The following is a list of academics, both past and present, noted for their contributions to the field of developmental psychology.

A 

Edith Ackermann (1946–2016)
Lauren Adamson
Mary Ainsworth (1913–1999)
Martha W. Alibali
Louise Bates Ames (1908–1906)
Jeffrey Arnett
Louise Arseneault

B 
Renée Baillargeon
James Mark Baldwin (1861–1934)
 Simon Baron-Cohen
 Rachel Barr
Nancy Bayley (1899–1994)
Diana Baumrind (1927–2018)
Leann Birch (1946–2019)
 David F. Bjorklund 
 John Bowlby (1907–1990)
 Urie Bronfenbrenner (1917–2005)
Christia Spears Brown
 Jerome Bruner (1915-2016)
Charlotte Bühler
 Erica Burman

C 
 Stephen J. Ceci
 Edouard Claparède (1873-1940)
Mamie Phipps Clark (1917–1983)
K. Alison Clarke-Stewart (1943–2014)
Cynthia García Coll
Wendy Craig
Nicki R. Crick (1958–2012)

D 
Brian D'Onofrio
Kazimierz Dąbrowski
Kirby Deater-Deckard
Andreas Demetriou
Martin Deutsch
Rheta DeVries
Adele Diamond
Judith Dunn

E 
Jacquelynne Eccles
Kieran Egan (1942-)
Bruce J. Ellis
 Erik Erikson (1902–1994)

F 
Shirley Feldman
Anne Fernald
Sigmund Freud (1856–1939)
Robyn Fivush
Uta Frith (1941–)
Hans G. Furth

G 
 Howard Gardner (1943–)
Eleanor J. Gibson (1910–2002)
Roberta Michnick Golinkoff
Florence Goodenough (1886–1959)
Gail Goodman
Alison Gopnik
Thérèse Gouin-Décarie 
Clare W. Graves (1914-1986)
Giordana Grossi

H 
 G. Stanley Hall (1844–1924)
Isoko Hatano (1905–1978)
 Jutta Heckhausen
Kathy Hirsh-Pasek
 Lois Holzman
Ruth Winifred Howard (1900–1997)

I 
Bärbel Inhelder (1913–1997)
Susan Sutherland Isaacs (1885–1948)
Jana Iverson

K 
Robert Kegan
Melanie Klein (1882–1960)
 Grazyna Kochanska
Lawrence Kohlberg (1927–1987)
 Helen L. Koch (1895-1977)

L 
Daniel Levinson (1920–1994)
Lee C. Lee (1935–2006)
Abraham Low (1891–1954)
Margaret Lowenfeld (1890–1973)

M 
Eleanor Maccoby (1917–2018)
James Marcia
Ann Masten
Daphne Maurer
Andrew N. Meltzoff (1950-)

N 

 Katherine Nelson (1930–2018)
John Nesselroade
Erich Neumann
Elissa L. Newport
Anat Ninio
Mary Louise Northway

O 

Jelena Obradovic
Kristina Olson
Joy Osofsky
Willis Overton

P 
 Juan Pascual-Leone
 Jean Piaget (1896–1980)
Debra Pepler

R 

 Harriet Lange Rheingold (1908-2000)
 Gina Rippon
 Michael Rutter (1933-2021)

S 

 Jenny Saffran
 Arnold J. Sameroff
 Núria Sebastián Gallés
 Michael Siegal
 Linda Siegel
 Robert S. Siegler
 Marian Sigman

B.F. Skinner (1904–1990)
Sara Smilansky (1922–2006)
Linda B. Smith
Andrea Smorti
Catherine E. Snow
Aletha Solter
Edmund Sonuga-Barke
Elizabeth Spelke
Margaret Beale Spencer
Clara Stern (1877–1945) 
Robert Stoller (1925–1991)

T 
Esther Thelen
Barbara Tizard
Deborah Tolman
Michael Tomasello
Edward Tronick
Elliot Tucker-Drob
Gerald Turkewitz

V 

 Jaan Valsiner

Lev Vygotsky (1896–1934)

W 

Theodore Wachs
John B. Watson (1878–1958)
Sandra Waxman
Richard A. Weinberg
Janet F. Werker

Developmental psychologists
Developmental psychologists
Cognitive science lists